is a Japanese footballer who plays as a centre back for  club Kashiwa Reysol.

Club career
On 15 March 2017, Tatsuta made his professional debut in J.League Cup against Kashiwa Reysol.

International career
On May 24, 2019, Tatsuta was called by Japan's head coach Hajime Moriyasu to feature in the Copa América played in Brazil. He made his debut on 20 June 2019 in the game against Uruguay, as an 87th-minute substitute for Tomoki Iwata.

Club statistics
.

National team statistics

References

External links

Profile at Shimizu S-Pulse

1998 births
Living people
Japanese footballers
Japan youth international footballers
Japan international footballers
Association football people from Shizuoka Prefecture
J1 League players
Shimizu S-Pulse players
Kashiwa Reysol players
Association football defenders
Footballers at the 2018 Asian Games
Asian Games silver medalists for Japan
Asian Games medalists in football
Medalists at the 2018 Asian Games
2019 Copa América players